The Dreaded P. D. Q. Bach Collection is a collection of works by Peter Schickele under the pseudonym of P. D. Q. Bach originally recorded on the Vanguard Records label by the composer. It includes the complete contents of the first five P. D. Q. Bach albums, plus the never-before-released "Sanka" Cantata.

Track listing 
Disc 1
1 In the Vanguard Vault, Part 1
2–19 Peter Schickele Presents an Evening with P. D. Q. Bach (1807–1742)?
20–31 An Hysteric Return: P.D.Q. Bach at Carnegie Hall

Disc 2
1–9 An Hysteric Return continued
10–33 Report from Hoople: P. D. Q. Bach on the Air

Disc 3
1–20 P. D. Q. Bach's Half-Act Opera, "The Stoned Guest"

Disc 4
1–29 The Intimate P. D. Q. Bach
30 In the Vanguard Vault, Part 2 (new track)
31 The "Sanka" Cantata (P.D.Q. Bach) (new track)
32 In the Vanguard Vault, Part 3 (new track)

References

P. D. Q. Bach compilation albums
1996 compilation albums
1990s comedy albums
Vanguard Records compilation albums